The Communauté d'agglomération de Marne et Chantereine is a former federation of municipalities (communauté d'agglomération) in the Seine-et-Marne département and in the Île-de-France région of France. It was created in January 2009. It was merged into the Communauté d'agglomération Paris - Vallée de la Marne in January 2016.

Composition 
The Communauté d'agglomération de Marne et Chantereine comprised 4 communes:
Brou-sur-Chantereine
Chelles
Courtry
Vaires-sur-Marne

See also
Communes of the Seine-et-Marne department

References

Geography of Seine-et-Marne
Former agglomeration communities in France